Tomorrow Morning is the ninth studio album by Eels; the third in a trilogy of concept albums including Hombre Lobo (2009) and End Times (2010).

Release
The album has been released on Compact Disc, a two-CD edition with a bonus EP, and a vinyl edition with the EP and a bonus 7" single. The vinyl edition was released on August 17, 2010, and the CD versions followed on August 24.

The band toured for the first time since their 2008 An Evening with Eels tour to support this release.

Critical reception

AllMusic wrote "While some of this album feels a bit rushed at times, as a whole Tomorrow Morning is a welcome contrast to the darkness of its predecessors, and a deft summertime pop record." Wilbur Kane of The Skinny noted the album's optimistic tone — especially in comparison to Hombre Lobo — as well as the melodic tone of "Spectacular Girl", which he compared to Beautiful Freak.

Track listing
All songs written by E (Mark Oliver Everett).
"In Gratitude for This Magnificent Day" – 1:25
"I'm a Hummingbird" – 3:14
"The Morning" – 2:17
"Baby Loves Me" – 3:27
"Spectacular Girl" – 3:15
"What I Have to Offer" – 2:55
"This Is Where It Gets Good" – 6:18
"After the Earthquake" – 1:39
"Oh So Lovely" – 4:17
"The Man" – 3:51
"Looking Up" – 2:57
"That's Not Her Way" – 3:48
"I Like the Way This Is Going" – 2:35
"Mystery of Life" – 4:22

Bonus EP
"Swimming Lesson" – 2:55
"St. Elizabeth Story" – 2:29
"Let's Ruin Julie's Birthday" – 3:15
"For You" – 2:43

Personnel
Eels
The Amy Davies Choir – harmony vocals
E – vocals, guitars, bass guitar, harmonica, piano, Optigan, Hammond B3 organ, banjo, harmonium, Vox Continental organ, drums, percussion, and production
Knuckles – drums
Koool G Murder – bass guitar, guitar, recording and mixing
Tomorrow Morning Orchestra – horns

Charts

Weekly charts

Year-end charts

References

2010 albums
Concept albums
Eels (band) albums
Vagrant Records albums
Albums produced by Mark Oliver Everett